The 2007 Laurie O'Reilly Cup was the sixth edition of the competition and was held between 16 and 20 October at New Zealand. New Zealand retained the O'Reilly Cup after winning both matches.

The Wallaroos began their New Zealand tour with a warm-up match against the Central Regions Development team in Palmerston North.

Table

Results

1st Test

Source:

2nd Test

Source:

References 

Laurie O'Reilly Cup
Australia women's national rugby union team
New Zealand women's national rugby union team
Laurie O'Reilly Cup